Marshall Moore (born in June 1970), in Havelock, North Carolina, is an American author and academic living in Cornwall, England. He attended the North Carolina School of Science and Mathematics (NCSSM) and went on to obtain a BA in psychology from East Carolina University, an MA in applied linguistics from the University of New England, and a PhD in creative writing from Aberystwyth University in Wales. He has also studied at Gallaudet University. He has lived in New Bern, Winston-Salem, Greensboro, Washington DC, Maryland, Oakland, Portland, Seattle, the suburbs of Seoul, and Hong Kong. Fluent in American Sign Language, he worked for many years as an interpreter before moving abroad.

Bibliography

Novels 
 The Concrete Sky, Binghamton, NY: Haworth Press, 2003
 An Ideal for Living, Maple Shade, NJ: Lethe Press, 2010
 Bitter Orange, Hong Kong: Signal 8 Press, 2013
 Inhospitable, Manchester: Camphor Press, 2018

Nonfiction
 I Wouldn't Normally Do This Kind of Thing: A Memoir, New Orleans: Rebel Satori Press, 2022
 Blood and Black T-Shirts: Dispatches from Hong Kong's Descent into Hell 2019-2020, Manchester: Camphor Press, 2023

Short story collections
 Black Shapes in a Darkened Room, San Francisco: Suspect Thoughts Press, 2004
 The Infernal Republic, Hong Kong: Signal 8 Press, 2012
 A Garden Fed by Lightning, Hong Kong: Signal 8 Press, 2016
 Love Is a Poisonous Color, New Orleans: Rebel Satori Press, 2023

In translation
 Sagome nere, Turin: 96, Rue de-la-Fontaine Edizioni, 2017 (Translator: Rossella Cirigliano)

Edited anthologies (short fiction)
 The Queen of Statue Square: New Short Fiction from Hong Kong (Co-editor: Xu Xi), Nottingham: Critical, Cultural & Communications Press, 2014

Edited academic nonfiction
 The Place and the Writer: International Intersections of Teacher Lore and Creative Writing Pedagogy (Co-editor: Sam Meekings) London: Bloomsbury - Continuum, 2021
 Creative Writing Scholars on the Publishing Trade: Practice, Praxis, Print (Co-editor: Sam Meekings) London: Routledge, 2022
 The Scholarship of Creative Writing Practice: Beyond Craft, Pedagogy, and the Academy (Co-editor: Sam Meekings) London: Bloomsbury - Continuum, 2023–24

Chapbooks
 Il look del diavolo, Hong Kong: Signal 8 Press, 2011
 Never Turn Away, Hong Kong: Signal 8 Press, 2013

In addition to these books, Moore has published dozens of short stories, book reviews, and essays.

His work has been translated into Greek, Polish, and Italian.

External links
Marshall Moore website

1970 births
East Carolina University alumni
21st-century American novelists
American male novelists
Living people
People from Havelock, North Carolina
American gay writers
Novelists from North Carolina
LGBT people from North Carolina
American LGBT novelists
American male short story writers
21st-century American short story writers
American expatriates in Hong Kong
21st-century American male writers